The Faith Presbytery, Bible Presbyterian Church (FPBPC) is a Reformed Christian denomination formed in 2008 by conservative Presbyterian clergy and churches who disassociated from the Bible Presbyterian Synod Synod. Faith Presbytery continues in the same spirit and stand taken by the Bible Presbyterian Church since its founding in 1937.

History 

The Bible Presbyterian Church (BPC) emerged in 1937, formed by a group of churches that separated from the Orthodox Presbyterian Church (OPC). Many of the Bible Presbyterians were Premillennialists, a view barely tolerated by many in the OPC. The OPC was predominantly Amillennial. Also, Bible Presbyterians believed it was important to warn their young people against the use of alcohol, drugs and various worldly practices. Some in the OPC believed this was the sin of “adding to Scripture.” Years later, some of these same OPC men even opposed condemnation of abortion, saying that such amounted to adding to Scripture.

In the 2000s, the BPC Synod narrowly voted to establish relations with the OPC, at a time when the OPC was tolerating ministers whose teaching was seen, even by some of the fathers of the OPC, as adding works to the all-important doctrine of justification by faith alone.

This was unacceptable to a sizable minority of members of the BPC. On March 28, 2008, the South Atlantic Presbytery of the BPC voted to amicably disassociate from the BPC Synod, by a vote of 72%, and adopted the name "Faith Presbytery, Bible Presbyterian Church"

Doctrine and Government 

Faith Presbytery, Bible Presbyterian Church, believes the Bible to be inspired by God, infallible and inerrant, and that it is our "only infallible rule of faith and practice." In addition it subscribes to the Westminster Confession of Faith, Westminster Larger Catechism and Westminster Shorter Catechism as its secondary standards. It is governed by the Form of Government and Book of Discipline of the Bible Presbyterian Church.

Interecclesiastical Relations 

The denomination is a member of the International Council of Christian Churches and the American Council of Christian Churches.

References 

Redeeming the Time magazine is edited by those in Faith Presbytery, Bible Presbyterian Church: 

Presbyterian denominations in the United States
Presbyterian denominations established in the 21st century
Christian organizations established in 2008